$20 a Week is a 1935 American melodrama film directed by Wesley Ford and starring James Murray, Pauline Starke, and Gwen Lee. It was released on February 2, 1935.

Plot
Sally Blair, a feisty young stenographer is in the employ of a Mr. Warner, an insurance agent who fancies his chances. She accepts a date even though she had made plans with the new salesman, Peter Douglas. Warner takes Sally to a nightclub and, in a private room, tries to kiss her. She retaliates by punching him. Warner, for reasons unknown, promotes Sally to his personal secretary. Later, at a wedding, Peter proposes to Sally. The next day, Peter's mother, who believes Sally is after his money, warns her to keep away from Peter. Naturally, they end up getting married.

Cast list
 Pauline Starke as Sally Blair
 James Murray as Peter Douglas
 Gwen Lee as Ann Seymour
 Dorothy Revier as Linda Davidson
 William Worthington as Mr. Davidson
 Andy Rice Jr. as Mac Tierney
 Bartlett Carré as Jimmy Dale
 Glorian Grey as Mamie
 Bryant Washburn as Warner
 Vessie Farrell as Mrs. Douglas

Production
In November 1934, Rob Eden's story, $20 a Week was purchased by the independent producer Burton L. King, with the intent of making the film independently and distributing it through Ajax Distributing Corporation. The film was to be the first in a series of four pictures. By the end of the month King had formed his production house, Four-Leaf Clover Productions, and had signed Pauline Starke to star in the film. In December the name of the production company had become Ajax Pictures, and $20 a Week was the first of 10 films planned by the company. By the end of December 1934 the filming on the picture had been completed. In January 1935 it was revealed that John Murray was also starring in the film.

Reception
The Film Daily gave the film a mostly negative review, calling Wesley Ford's direction "unnatural", and Al Martin's cinematography only fair. However, they did enjoy Starke's performance, saying that at times it rose "to excellent work", despite the mediocrity of the film.

References

External links
 
 

American comedy-drama films
1935 comedy-drama films
Melodrama films
American black-and-white films
1935 films
1930s English-language films
Films directed by Wesley Ford
1930s American films